Dennis Alan Felton (born June 21, 1963) is an American basketball coach who is the associate head coach at George Mason University. His previous tenure was as an assistant coach at Fordham University. He is also the former head men's basketball coach at the University of Georgia, Western Kentucky University, and Cleveland State, and also served as a player personnel assistant for the National Basketball Association's San Antonio Spurs.

Felton was born in Tokyo, Japan and spent his early years living in and visiting a variety of locales around the world, due to his father's career in the United States Air Force. His family eventually moved to Clinton, Maryland, a suburban town in the Washington, D.C., area, a short distance from Andrews Air Force Base. Felton graduated from Surrattsville High School in 1981 and went on to Prince George's Community College. He completed his athletic and academic careers at Howard University in 1985, where he was a Mid-Eastern Athletic Conference All-Academic selection.

College coaching
Felton got his start in the coaching profession as an assistant basketball coach at Oxon Hill High School in 1984. He then became an assistant coach at Charles County Community College, for one season (1985–86) before moving on to University of Delaware as an assistant coach for four seasons (1986–90). Felton continued his collegiate career with one season each at Tulane University and St. Joseph's University. In 1992, he took an assistant's post at Providence College under Rick Barnes. That season began a 6-year apprenticeship with Barnes that included two with the Friars and four at Clemson University (1994–98). The six teams that Barnes and Felton coached together all posted winning seasons (including three 20-win campaigns), all played in the postseason (four NCAA berths, two in the NIT) and went 114–71, averaging 19 wins per year.

Western Kentucky
In the spring of 1998, just before Barnes left Clemson for Texas, Felton was named the head coach at Western Kentucky University. His first two Hilltopper squads went a combined 24–34. The 1999 team advanced to the Sun Belt Tournament title game. His Hilltopper teams won the Sun Belt Conference tournament titles in 2001, 2002, and 2003.

Georgia
In April 2003 Felton was hired as the head coach at the University of Georgia. Felton also took assistant coaches Bert Tucker and Ken McDonald as well as associate head coach Pete Herrmann with him to Athens.

In his first four seasons at Georgia, Felton had compiled a 58–63 record with two NIT appearances while attempting to lead Georgia back from the severe disadvantages that previous coach Jim Harrick dealt the program. Despite having only 9 scholarship players in 2007–2008, Felton's Bulldogs completed a successful run in SEC tournament championship history. Entering the 2008 SEC men's basketball tournament as the lowest seed, Georgia won 4 games in 3 days to capture the conference tournament crown and the corresponding automatic berth in the 2008 NCAA men's basketball tournament. In their first NCAA Tournament appearance since 2002, the Bulldogs were defeated by Xavier University in the first round in Washington, D.C.

On January 29, 2009, Dennis Felton was fired as head coach of the UGA Men's Basketball team. This came with a losing streak that left the team with a 9–11 record in mid-season. He finished his career as the coach of UGA Men's Basketball team with an 84–91 record. Associate Head Coach Pete Herrmann finished the 2008–2009 season as the interim head coach.

Tulsa
Felton returned to college coaching after stints in the NBA, as an assistant coach on Frank Haith's staff at Tulsa.

Cleveland State
On March 24, 2017, Felton was hired as the head coach of Cleveland State University. On March 27, 2017 Felton was officially introduced as head coach. Felton's contract was for five years. On July 12, 2019, he was fired, along with his entire coaching staff.

Fordham
In 2019, Felton was hired as an assistant coach at Fordham University.

NBA coaching career
During the 2009–2010 NBA season, Felton served on the scouting staff for the Phoenix Suns, mainly observing NCAA games in the Southeast. He was also a part of the Suns' war room during the NBA draft in June 2010, led by General Manager Steve Kerr and head coach Alvin Gentry.

On June 28, 2010, the New Jersey Nets announced that Felton would be an assistant coach for their Summer League team.

Prior to the start of the 2010–2011 NBA season, he was hired by the San Antonio Spurs as Director of Pro Player Personnel, a position he held through 2013.

Head coaching record

Personal
Felton is married to the former Melanie Smith, who is also a Howard alumna. The couple reside in Milton, Georgia with their two sons, Jazz and Nile. Jazz and Nile are both basketball players. Jazz was a part of Milton High School's state championship team as a freshman in 2009–2010. Jazz will attend WKU and will serve on Ray Harper's coaching staff.

References

External links
 Fordham Rams bio
 Tulsa Golden Hurricane bio

1963 births
Living people
American men's basketball coaches
American men's basketball players
Basketball coaches from Maryland
Basketball coaches from Washington, D.C.
Basketball players from Maryland
Basketball players from Tokyo
Basketball players from Washington, D.C.
Clemson Tigers men's basketball coaches
Cleveland State Vikings men's basketball coaches
College men's basketball head coaches in the United States
Delaware Fightin' Blue Hens men's basketball coaches
Fordham Rams men's basketball coaches
Georgia Bulldogs basketball coaches
High school basketball coaches in Maryland
Howard Bison men's basketball players
Junior college men's basketball coaches in the United States
Junior college men's basketball players in the United States
People from Clinton, Maryland
Providence Friars men's basketball coaches
Saint Joseph's Hawks men's basketball coaches
Tulane Green Wave men's basketball coaches
Western Kentucky Hilltoppers basketball coaches